Pyresthesis is a genus of spiders in the family Thomisidae. It was first described in 1880 by Butler. , it contains only one species, Pyresthesis laevis, found in Madagascar.

References

Thomisidae
Monotypic Araneomorphae genera
Spiders of Madagascar